The Battle of the Trench was fought in Medina in 627 between Muslims and Arab-Jewish tribes.

Battle of the Trench may also refer to:

Battles 

 Battle of Leontion (c. 217 BCE)
 Battle of the Great Foss (7th-century BCE)
 Battle of the Trench (1821)

Other uses 

 Trench warfare, land military strategical warfare